Maorimorpha secunda is a species of sea snail, a marine gastropod mollusk in the family Mitromorphidae.

Description
The length of the shell attains 4.6 mm, its diameter 1.7 mm.

Distribution
This marine species is endemic to New Zealand occurs off South Island at a depth of 130 m.

References

 Powell, Arthur William Baden. "The New Zealand recent and fossil Mollusca of the family Turridae with general notes on Turrid nomenclature and systematics." (1942).
 Powell, A.W.B. 1979: New Zealand Mollusca: Marine, Land and Freshwater Shells, Collins, Auckland (p. 237)
 Spencer, H.G., Marshall, B.A. & Willan, R.C. (2009). Checklist of New Zealand living Mollusca. pp. 196–219. in: Gordon, D.P. (ed.) New Zealand inventory of biodiversity. Volume one. Kingdom Animalia: Radiata, Lophotrochozoa, Deuterostomia. Canterbury University Press, Christchurch

External links
 Spencer H.G., Willan R.C., Marshall B.A. & Murray T.J. (2011). Checklist of the Recent Mollusca Recorded from the New Zealand Exclusive Economic Zone
 

secunda
Gastropods described in 1942
Gastropods of New Zealand